Phosphorus tribromide is a colourless liquid with the formula PBr3.  The liquid fumes in moist air due to hydrolysis and has a penetrating odour.  It is used in the laboratory for the conversion of alcohols to alkyl bromides.

Preparation
PBr3 is prepared by treating red phosphorus with bromine.  An excess of phosphorus is used in order to prevent formation of PBr5:
P4 +  6 Br2  →  4 PBr3
Because the reaction is highly exothermic, it is often conducted in the presence of a diluent such as PBr3. Phosphorus tribromide is also generated in situ from red phosphorus and bromine.

Reactions
Phosphorus tribromide, like PCl3 and PF3, has both properties of a Lewis base and a Lewis acid.  For example, with a Lewis acid such as boron tribromide it forms stable 1 :1 adducts such as Br3B · PBr3.  At the same time PBr3 can react as an electrophile or Lewis acid in many of its reactions, for example with amines.

An important reaction of PBr3 is with alcohols, where it replaces an OH group with a bromine atom to produce an alkyl bromide. All three bromides can be transferred.

Several detailed procedures are available.  In some cases, triphenylphosphine/Br2 is superior to PBr3.

The mechanism for a primary alcohol involves formation of a phosphorous ester (to form a good leaving group), followed by an SN2 substitution.

Because of the SN2 substitution step, the reaction generally works well for primary and secondary alcohols, but fails for tertiary alcohols.  If the reacting carbon centre is chiral, the reaction usually occurs with inversion of configuration at the carbon alpha to the alcohol, as is usual with an SN2 reaction.

In a similar reaction, PBr3 also converts carboxylic acids to acyl bromides:

Applications
The main use for phosphorus tribromide is for conversion of primary or secondary alcohols to alkyl bromides, as described above. PBr3 usually gives higher yields than hydrobromic acid, and it avoids problems of carbocation rearrangement- for example even neopentyl bromide can be made from the alcohol in 60% yield.

Another use for PBr3 is as a catalyst for the α-bromination of carboxylic acids.  Although acyl bromides are rarely made in comparison with acyl chlorides, they are used as intermediates in Hell-Volhard-Zelinsky halogenation.
Initially PBr3 reacts with the carboxylic acid to form the acyl bromide, which is more reactive towards bromination.  The overall process can be represented as

On a commercial scale, phosphorus tribromide is used in the manufacture of pharmaceuticals such as alprazolam, methohexital and fenoprofen. It is also a potent fire suppression agent marketed under the name PhostrEx.

Phosphorus tribromide is used for doping in microelectronics.

Precautions
PBr3 evolves corrosive HBr, which is toxic, and reacts violently with water and alcohols.

PBr3 + 3 H2O → H3PO3 + 3 HBr

In reactions that produce phosphorous acid as a by-product, when working up by distillation be aware that this can decompose above about 160 °C to give phosphine which can cause explosions in contact with air.

References

Further reading
 
 
 
 
 

Phosphorus bromides
Reagents for organic chemistry
Inorganic solvents
Fire suppression agents
Phosphorus(III) compounds